The 2014–15 season was Unione Sportiva Sassuolo Calcio's second consecutive season in Serie A after having been promoted at the end of the 2012–13 season. The club improved markedly on its 2013–14 season, when it finished just above the relation zone in 17th place, by finishing 12th in the 2014–15 campaign, safely in midtable and without the threat of relegation which had dogged the club during its first season in Serie A. The club also competed in the Coppa Italia, where it was eliminated in the Round of 16.

Players

Squad information
.

Transfers

In

Competitions

Serie A

League table

Results summary

Results by round

Matches

Coppa Italia

Statistics

Appearances and goals

|-
! colspan="10" style="background:#dcdcdc; text-align:center"| Goalkeepers

|-
! colspan="10" style="background:#dcdcdc; text-align:center"| Defenders

|-
! colspan="10" style="background:#dcdcdc; text-align:center"| Midfielders

|-
! colspan="10" style="background:#dcdcdc; text-align:center"| Forwards

|-
! colspan="10" style="background:#dcdcdc; text-align:center"| Players transferred out during the season

Goalscorers

Last updated: 30 May 2015

References

Sassuolo
U.S. Sassuolo Calcio seasons